Doug Anderson was a columnist and writer for The Sydney Morning Herald, who specialised in film and television. He started work as a proofreader in 1969, staying at the paper for 43 years.

He has served as an adjudicator at the Banff Television Festival.

References

Australian journalists
Living people
Year of birth missing (living people)
The Sydney Morning Herald people